Dirty Business may refer to:

Books
Dirty Business, by William Mastrosimone
Dirty Business, by Ovid Demaris

Film and television
Watermen: A Dirty Business, a 2014 BBC six-part series
"Dirty Business" (Garfield and Friends), 1990 episode
Dirty Business, documentary by the Center for Investigative Reporting

Music
"Dirty Business", a song by New Riders of the Purple Sage from their eponymous album
"Dirty Business", a song by Sara Jorge from R3MIX
"Dirty Business", a song by Widespread Panic from Live at Myrtle Beach